Waco: Madman or Messiah is a 2018 American documentary film directed by Christopher Spencer about the Branch Davidians and David Koresh in the years leading up to and including the 51-day stand-off with the FBI which ended with the 1993 raid on Mount Carmel, Texas. The four-hour, two-part documentary special premiered on January 28, 2018.

References 

2018 television films
American documentary television films
A&E (TV network) original programming
Waco siege
Biographical documentary films
2018 documentary films
2018 films
Films about religious violence in the United States
2010s American films